Isela is a genus of spiders in the family Mysmenidae. It was first described in 1985 by Griswold. , it contains 2 African species.

References

Mysmenidae
Araneomorphae genera
Spiders of Africa